Megachile grisea is a species of bee in the family Megachilidae. It was described by Johan Christian Fabricius in 1794.

References

Grisea
Insects described in 1794